Jan Ludvig (born September 17, 1961) is a Czech former professional ice hockey forward.  He played in the National Hockey League with the New Jersey Devils and Buffalo Sabres. His son, John Ludvig, also plays professional ice hockey. His other son Jake, does not.

In his NHL career, Ludvig appeared in 314 games.  He scored 54 goals and added 87 assists.
Ludvig is currently a scout with the Boston Bruins and runs an ice rink.

In 2008 Ludvig competed in the Erzberg Rodeo for the first time, competing seven times through the 2014 event. He plans to return in 2016 to the Iron Giant.

Career statistics

Regular season and playoffs

International

References

External links

 S kytarou až do NHL. Příběh emigranta Ludviga, teď skauta Liberce

1961 births
Buffalo Sabres players
Czech ice hockey right wingers
Czechoslovak defectors
Czechoslovak ice hockey right wingers
HC Litvínov players
Kamloops Junior Oilers players
Living people
Maine Mariners players
New Jersey Devils players
New Jersey Devils scouts
Sportspeople from Liberec
Undrafted National Hockey League players
Wichita Wind players
Boston Bruins scouts
Czechoslovak expatriate ice hockey people
Czechoslovak expatriate sportspeople in the United States
Czechoslovak expatriate sportspeople in Canada
Expatriate ice hockey players in Canada
Expatriate ice hockey players in the United States
Czechoslovak emigrants to Canada